Auxopus is a genus of the family Orchidaceae. It belongs to the tribe Gastrodieae.

Little is known about the flower structure of members of Gastrodieae, which are saprophytic.  Auxopus are leafless and contain inflorescences of flowers with their sepals and petals united.

Auxopus has 4 known species, native to tropical Africa and Madagascar.

Auxopus kamerunensis Schltr. - Ghana, Guinea, Ivory Coast, Liberia, Nigeria, Central African Republic, Cameroon, Gabon 
Auxopus letouzeyi Szlach. - Cameroon
Auxopus macranthus Summerh. - Ghana, Ivory  Coast, Nigeria, Cameroon, Uganda, Democratic Republic of the Congo  
Auxopus madagascariensis Schltr. - Madagascar

References 

 Dressler, Robert L. The Orchids: Natural History and Classification. Cambridge: Harvard University Press, 1981.

External links 

Gastrodieae genera
Orchids of Africa
Orchids of Madagascar
Gastrodieae